Alagappa Government Polytechnic College is a major Government polytechnic college in Karaikudi, Tamil Nadu, India. It is held directly under the control of the Government of Tamil Nadu. It is located next to the ACCET campus in Karaikudi.

External links 
 Alagappa Government Polytechnic College web site.

Colleges in Tamil Nadu
Education in Sivaganga district
Karaikudi
Educational institutions established in 1952
1952 establishments in Madras State